Purple Skirt was a style and fashion-focused web site with an online boutique. It was the brainchild of Tracey Ullman. The site collected and sold clothing and accessories from both established and up-and-coming designers. It provided advice from stylists and costumes designers in the entertainment industry. Ullman wrote a monthly column. The web site was launched in November 1999 and was co-founded by Stephanie Laing and Jeannine Braden.

Television series
In 2001, Ullman hosted a spin-off television talk show series for the Oxygen Network, Tracey Ullman's Visible Panty Lines. Like Purple Skirt, the show showcased fashion and style advice from industry experts, along with sit-down interviews with celebrities discussing their own personal style.

References

External links
 Press release concerning the launch of Purple Skirt
 What's So Funny About a Purple Skirt?
 Tracey takes on skirts
 Ullman's Clothes Call

Online clothing retailers of the United States
Internet properties established in 1999
Defunct online companies of the United States
Defunct websites
1999 establishments in California